Nuclear Destruction is a play-by-mail (PBM) game. It was published by Rick Loomis of Flying Buffalo Inc. in 1970. As the first professional PBM game, it started the commercial PBM industry. Offered by postal mail initially, the game is available by email as well in the 21st century. Active for 52 years, as of October 2021, Rick Loomis PBM Games publishes the game. Players use strategic missiles, factories, money, and other elements of gameplay with a focus on diplomacy to win by becoming the sole survivor.

Development
Nuclear Destruction was the first game offered by Flying Buffalo Inc., and started the professional PBM industry. It was the first professional PBM game. Flying Buffalo Inc. offered the game through mail initially, but it is a play-by-email (PBEM) game in the 21st century as well. As of October 2021, Rick Loomis PBM Games publishes the game. Nuclear Destruction has been active since 1970.

Gameplay
According to reviewer Charles Mosteller, editor in chief of Suspense and Decision, the modern PBM magazine, Nuclear Destruction is a "Strategic missile game with emphasis on diplomacy". The object is to be the sole survivor at the end of the game, by arranging for the other players to be destroyed with nuclear missiles. Player tools include missiles, "anti-missiles", factories, and money for influencing other players.

Flying Buffalo ran multiple versions of Nuclear Destruction. In 1973 there was a "Ladies ND" as well as a two-player version where, in the latter case, the players were USSR and China. Also in 1973, groups of four to six players could also against each other in "Gang-War ND", and "Private ND" games were available for play with friends. In 1979, there was a "Partners ND" where two friends could play together; "Blitz ND", a costlier game with shorter turnaround times and priority mailing; and "Bribery ND" where players did not pay turn fees but could purchase extra resources (e.g., missiles and spies).

Reception

In Issue 9 of Command, Dennis Agosta admired Nuclear Destruction for the lack of any random factor. "It's intellect against intellect, where the outcome of the game is determined by how you and your allies (if any) make your moves." He concluded, "The excitement level of PBM Nuclear Destruction is very high, especially when the game is run on one or two week deadlines."

See also
 List of play-by-mail games

Notes

References

Bibliography

Further reading
 

Play-by-mail games